Stefan Daniel Cleveland (born May 25, 1994) is an American professional soccer player who plays as a goalkeeper for Major League Soccer club Seattle Sounders FC.

Early life
Cleveland was born in Dayton, Ohio, and attended The Miami Valley School.

Career

College and amateur
Cleveland spent four years at Dartmouth College playing college soccer. After earning an engineering degree from Dartmouth College in 2016, Cleveland began graduate school at the University of Louisville in 2017. While at University of Louisville, Cleveland used his final season of NCAA eligibility playing for the Cardinals.

In 2015, Cleveland appeared for Premier Development League side Dayton Dutch Lions.

Professional
On January 13, 2017, Cleveland was drafted in the second round as the 26th overall pick in the 2017 MLS SuperDraft by Chicago Fire. He signed with the club on January 30, 2017.

He made his professional debut on May 27, 2017, whilst on loan with Chicago's United Soccer League affiliate Tulsa Roughnecks during a 3-1 win over Portland Timbers 2. He made his MLS debut on August 4, 2018, starting in a 2-1 loss to Real Salt Lake, making 8 saves and allowing 2 goals.

Cleveland was acquired by Seattle Sounders FC on November 26, 2019. He has mainly played for reserve team Tacoma Defiance or filled in for starting Sounders goalkeeper Stefan Frei during congested weeks of the season or with injuries. Cleveland played 16 matches during the 2021 season after Frei injured his knee early in the season. On January 19, 2022, Cleveland re-signed with the Sounders.

Career statistics

Club

Honors
Seattle Sounders FC
CONCACAF Champions League: 2022

References

External links 
 
 
 

1994 births
Living people
Sportspeople from Dayton, Ohio
Soccer players from Ohio
American soccer players
Association football goalkeepers
Dartmouth Big Green men's soccer players
Louisville Cardinals men's soccer players
Major League Soccer players
MLS Next Pro players
USL Championship players
USL League One players
USL League Two players
Dayton Dutch Lions players
Chicago Fire FC players
FC Tulsa players
Lansing Ignite FC players
Seattle Sounders FC players
Chicago Fire FC draft picks
Tacoma Defiance players